Robert Prygiel (born 14 April 1976) is a Polish volleyball coach and former volleyball player, member of the Poland men's national volleyball team in 1996–2007, participant of the Olympic Games Atlanta 1996, Polish Champion (1997).

Personal life
He was born in Radom, Poland. He graduated from the School of Property Management in Warszawa. He is married to Katarzyna. They have three daughters – Zuzanna (born 2002), Nina (born 2005) and Kalina (born 2010).

Career as coach
He debuted as a coach in 2013. He was a head coach of Cerrad Czarni Radom, where he ended his career as a player. In 2015 he was replaced by Raúl Lozano.

Sporting achievements

As a player
 CEV Challenge Cup
  2008/2009 – with Jastrzębski Węgiel
 National championships
 1996/1997  Polish Championship, with AZS Częstochowa

References

External links
 Player profile at PlusLiga.pl
 Coach/Player Profile at Volleybox.net

1976 births
Living people
People from Radom
Sportspeople from Masovian Voivodeship
Polish men's volleyball players
Olympic volleyball players of Poland
Volleyball players at the 1996 Summer Olympics
Czarni Radom players
AZS Częstochowa players
Legia Warsaw (volleyball) players
Skra Bełchatów players
Jastrzębski Węgiel players
Jadar Radom players
Projekt Warsaw players
Czarni Radom coaches